Ocean View School District is an elementary and middle school district located in Orange County, California, encompassing 13.18 miles.  The District offices are located at 17200 Pinehurst Lane, Huntington Beach, CA 92647-5569.  The Ocean View School District has a total of 17 preschool, elementary and middle school campuses in Huntington Beach, Fountain Valley, Midway City and Westminster.  The Ocean View School District superintendent is Dr. Carol Hansen and the deputy superintendent is Dr. Michael Conroy.

Ocean View School District operates preschools, elementary schools and middle schools. High school students within the District go to the Huntington Beach Union High School District.  Within the Ocean View School District are: two national Blue Ribbon Schools, thirteen California Distinguished Schools, six Title I Academic Achieving Schools, three Golden Bell Schools, and one NASA Explorer School.

History 

The Ocean View School District is one of the oldest school districts in Orange County, California.  It was formed in 1874, twenty-four years after California became a state and fifteen years before the County of Orange separated from Los Angeles County, becoming a separate governmental entity.  The original Ocean View School was constructed in 1886 on the southwest corner of Huntington Beach Boulevard (Beach Boulevard) and Smeltzer Avenue (Edinger Avenue) in what was known as the village of Smeltzer, now part of north Huntington Beach. Students were from the surrounding farm communities of Ocean View, Smeltzer and Wintersburg Village.

The second Ocean View School was constructed in 1911, at Huntington Beach Boulevard (Beach Boulevard) and Wintersburg Road (Warner Avenue).  Students moved from the original school to the new location at the beginning of 1912.  The Ocean View Grammar School served as the only school in the Ocean View District until 1956.

District Strategic Plan 2014-2019 

The Local Control and Accountability Plan (LCAP) was created in a collaborative process to set local priorities for 2014 to 2019. A team of 
District stakeholders generated five overriding Focus Areas and their underlying Strategic Initiatives, which include 1) Effective Instruction and Academic Achievement, 2) Effective Leadership and Professional Development, 3) Engaged Community, 4) Safe and Respectful Environment, and 5) Optimized Resources.

2016 Facilities Master Plan  

Ocean View School District created a digital 2016 Facilities Master Plan website to provide information on the long-term planning for each of the seventeen schools in the District. As of 2015-2016, the total enrollment in the District was 8,725, with a median household income of $79,652. The District's demographic breakdown at the time of the 2016 Facilities Master Plan was: 39.3% White, 38.3% Hispanic or Latino, 14.2% Asian, 4.9% Mixed, 1.3% Filipino, 1.1% Black or African American, 0.4% Pacific Islander, 0.3% American Indian or Alaskan Native, with 0.1% None Reported.

As follow up to the 2016 Facilities Master Plan, Ocean View School District placed a $169-million funding mechanism, Measure R, on the November 8, 2016 ballot.  The stated purpose of Measure R is to complete projects that include student safety and campus security systems (security fencing, security cameras, emergency communications systems, smoke detectors, fire alarms, and sprinklers); repair or replace deteriorating roofs, plumbing, heating, ventilation, and electrical systems; provide equipment and technology to support science, reading, music, arts, and math programs; improve access to school facilities for students with disabilities; and ensure playground equipment and play areas meet present-day health and safety standards.

Finances

The District was in financial difficulty in early 2015 because of costs incurred with asbestos remediation in district schools. The District's deputy superintendent reported in late 2015 that the finances subsequently recovered as a result of the negotiation of funding measures and that the District would not be required to sell assets. The District receives nearly $2 million per year in total revenue from property it owns and now leases to Lowe's and Wal-Mart.

Board of Trustees

The Ocean View School District is governed by a five-member Board of Trustees.

 Gina Clayton-Tarvin, President
 Patricia Singer, Vice President
 Jack Souders, Clerk
 John Briscoe
 Norm Westwell

List of schools

Preschools
Oak View Preschool
Pleasant View

Elementary schools
Circle View
College View
Golden View
Harbour View
Hope View
Lake View
Meadow View (now used as a private school)
Oak View
Ocean View Elementary (closed) (SW Corner of Beach Blvd. & Warner)
Rancho View (closed)
Star View
Sun View, closed 2019. Now interim campus for schools undergoing renovation.
Village View
Westmont

Middle schools
Marine View
Mesa View
Spring View
Vista View

References

External links
 

School districts in Orange County, California
Westminster, California
Huntington Beach, California
1874 establishments in California
School districts established in 1874